Byron Black and Grant Connell were the defending champions, but Connell did not compete this year. Black teamed up with Brett Steven and lost in the quarterfinals to Jacco Eltingh and Paul Haarhuis.

Mahesh Bhupathi and Leander Paes won the title by defeating Sébastien Lareau and Alex O'Brien 6–4, 6–7, 6–2 in the final.

Seeds
The first four seeds received a bye into the second round.

Draw

Finals

Top half

Bottom half

References

External links
 Official results archive (ATP)
 Official results archive (ITF)

Doubles
Volvo International
1997 Pilot Pen International